The 1689 Programme of fifth rates were devised by Admiral the Earl of Torrington (Arthur Herbert) as the prototype demi-batterie ships of the Royal Navy. The concept was to have one tier of ordnance flush on the upper deck for use in all weathers on a freeboard of at least seven feet. The ordnance would be arranged with a minimum of ten gun ports on the upper deck. The lower deck would be provided with four ports for heavier guns that could only be used in calm weather. For added propulsion ten oar ports per side would be provided with a central loading port. Five new 32-gun vessels to these specifications were ordered from Naval Dockyards in June 1689.

Design and specifications
The construction of the vessels was assigned to Royal dockyards. As with most vessels of this time period only order and launch dates are available. The dimensional data listed here is the specification data and the acceptable design creep will be listed on each individual vessel. The tonnage calculation would be  bm. The ships would be sail powered carrying a ship-rigged sail plan. Also there was a provision for ten oar ports per side located between the gun ports on the upper deck.

The gun armament initially was four demi-culverines mounted on wooden trucks on the lower deck (LD) with two pair of guns per side. The upper deck (UD) battery would consist of between twenty and twenty-two sakers guns mounted on wooden trucks with ten or eleven guns per side. The gun battery would be completed by four to six minions guns mounted on wooden trucks on the quarterdeck (QD) with two to three guns per side. In the 1703 Establishment the old gun designations would be replaced by a system that designated the guns by the weight of shot fired. The demi-culverines would become known as 9-pounders, the Sakers as 6-pounders and the minions as 4-pounders. Therefore, their armament as of 1703 would be listed as four 9-pounder guns on the lower deck (LD), twenty 6-pounder 19 hundredweight (cwt) guns on the upper deck (UD) with four 4-pounder 12 cwt guns on the quarterdeck (QD). The 4-pounders would be removed in 1714.

Ships of the 1689 Programme Group

Notes

Citations

References
 Winfield 2009, British Warships in the Age of Sail (1603 – 1714), by Rif Winfield, published by Seaforth Publishing, England © 2009, EPUB , Chapter 5, The Fifth Rates, Vessels acquired from 16 December 1688, Fifth Rates of 32 and 36 guns, 1689 Programme
 Winfield 2007, British Warships in the Age of Sail (1714 – 1792), by Rif Winfield, published by Seaforth Publishing, England © 2007, EPUB , Chapter 6, Sixth Rates, Sixth Rates of 20 or 24 guns, Vessels acquired from 1 August 1714, 1719 Establishment Group
 Colledge, Ships of the Royal Navy, by J.J. Colledge, revised and updated by Lt Cdr Ben Warlow and Steve Bush, published by Seaforth Publishing, Barnsley, Great Britain, © 2020, EPUB 

 

Frigates of the Royal Navy
Ships of the Royal Navy